Citra Febrianti (born 22 February 1988) is an Indonesian weightlifter who won the silver medal at the 2012 Summer Olympics in the –53 kg category. She originally finished fourth, but was promoted to second after gold medallist Zulfiya Chinshanlo and bronze medallist Cristina Iovu were both disqualified.

References

1988 births
Living people
People from Pringsewu Regency
Sportspeople from Lampung
Indonesian female weightlifters
Weightlifters at the 2012 Summer Olympics
Olympic weightlifters of Indonesia
Olympic silver medalists for Indonesia
Olympic medalists in weightlifting
Medalists at the 2012 Summer Olympics
Weightlifters at the 2010 Asian Games
Weightlifters at the 2014 Asian Games
Asian Games competitors for Indonesia
Competitors at the 2011 Southeast Asian Games
Competitors at the 2013 Southeast Asian Games
Southeast Asian Games silver medalists for Indonesia
Southeast Asian Games bronze medalists for Indonesia
Southeast Asian Games medalists in weightlifting
Islamic Solidarity Games competitors for Indonesia
Islamic Solidarity Games medalists in weightlifting
21st-century Indonesian women